Geoffrey Edward Fulton Barnett (born 3 February 1984) is a Canadian and New Zealand cricket player who plays first-class cricket for the New Zealand Central Districts.

Barnett is a left-handed opening batsman who scored his maiden first-class century in his twelfth match, making 136 for Canada against Kenya in their Intercontinental Cup game in August which Canada won by 25 runs. This was his third outing for Canada, and his first in first-class cricket, after playing two One Day Internationals for Canada against Zimbabwe (where he was run out for 0) and Bermuda. In both matches he was dismissed in single figures. He then played in two more ODIs, against Kenya, scoring 35 in the second innings.

He has not played for Canada since then as he has been unavailable due to his commitments with Central Districts in New Zealand, although he was selected for Canada for a series of qualifying tournaments for the 2011 ICC World Cup.

References

External links
 

1984 births
Canada One Day International cricketers
Canada Twenty20 International cricketers
Canadian cricketers
Central Districts cricketers
Living people
New Zealand cricketers
Cricketers from Nelson, New Zealand